Saeed Al Hamsal (born April 8, 1996), is a Saudi Arabian professional footballer who plays as a right back for Saudi club Abha.

References

External links 
 

Living people
1996 births
Saudi Arabian footballers
People from Najran
Najran SC players
Abha Club players
Saudi First Division League players
Saudi Professional League players
Association football fullbacks